New Direction may refer to:

 "New Direction" (song), by S Club Juniors, 2002
 New Direction (think tank), a European political foundation based in Brussels, Belgium
 New Direction (comics), an imprint of EC Comics

See also
 New Directions (disambiguation)